Tabarjal (Arabic:طبرجل) is an important town in northern Saudi Arabia. The nearest big city is Qurayyat. Tabarjal is one of the major modern towns in the region of Al-Jawf, where it has for over forty years organized the settlement project and dug wells.

Economy 
State distribution of agricultural land extends to the west at the Jordanian border and to the east to Sakakah. Tabarjal is one of the most fertile sites in the region.

Etymology 
Tabarjal may be named for a traveling merchant named Jaloud who is believed to have died in the surrounding area between 650 and 750 A.D.

See also

 List of cities and towns in Saudi Arabia
 Agriculture in Saudi Arabia

References

Populated places in Al-Jawf Province